Bara Katra (Great Caravanserai) is one of the oldest historical and architectural monuments in Dhaka. The word Katra may have originated from Arabic word Katara which means colonnaded building. 'Katra/ katara' in Arabic and Persian means 'Caravan (Karwan) Sarai' or simply a 'Sarai'. It is a palatial building dating to the reign of the Mughal dynasty in the Bengal region. It is situated to the south of Chowk Bazaar close to the north bank of the river Buriganga. It was partially demolished in 2022.

History

Bara Katra was built between 1644 and 1646 AD by Mir Abul Qasim, the diwan (chief revenue official) of Mughal prince Shah Shuja. It was intended to be Shah Shuja's residence, but Shah Shuja endowed it to Mir Abul Qasem.

Less than half of the structure remains, and it is in disrepair. The Department of Archaeology has been unable to take charge of the monument owing to litigation and resistance from its owners. The owners have altered the original building and encroached upon it with new construction.

Architecture
The building follows the traditional pattern of Central Asian caravanserais and is embellished as per Mughal architecture. Originally it enclosed a quadrangular courtyard.

The southern wing extends , and fronted on the Buriganga River. In the middle is an entrance set in a three-storeyed projected bay. The gateway has an arched alcove that rises to the second story, above which are the windows of the third storey. The arched main entrance is in the centre of the alcove. The underside of the alcove, spandrels, and surrounding walls are decorated with plastered panels exhibiting a variety of forms, including four-centered, cusped, horseshoe, and flat arches. The main portion of the wing is two-storeyed and bookended by tall projected octagonal towers.

The northern wing was similar, but with a less elaborate gate. In the 19th century, Orientalist James Atkinson described the building as "a stupendous pile of grand and beautiful architecture".

The southern entrance leads to a guardroom, then an octagonal domed hall (the ceiling of which is plastered and decorated with net-patters and foliage designs), and finally to the courtyard. On the ground floor of the southern wing, there are five vaulted rooms to either side of the gateway. On the upper floor, living chambers open off of a corridor. Shops and living quarters surrounded the courtyard on all four sides.

Cultural significance
During the Mughal period, Dhaka was a port city. Large merchant ship could enter into the Buriganga river. This was the major trading connection between Indonesia and Dhaka. So, it was a major hub for import and export. Bara Katra was mainly used for customs clearance and resting space for merchants and travelers. This type of Caravan Sarai which consists of so many functions and features which makes it the most unique worldwide. This increases the value of  architectural and cultural heritage of Bangladesh.

See also
 Choto Katra
 Lalbagh Fort
 List of archaeological sites in Bangladesh

References

Further reading
 Hasan, Syed Mahmudul, Muslim Monuments of Bangladesh (Dhaka: Islamic Foundation, 1980)

External links

 Bara Katra architecture

Old Dhaka
History of Dhaka
Palaces in Bangladesh
Buildings and structures in Dhaka
Royal residences in Bangladesh
Houses completed in 1646
1646 establishments in Asia
1640s establishments in India
Tourist attractions in Dhaka
Mughal architecture